Taxation Minister of Denmark is the head of the Tax Ministry of Denmark and a member of the Cabinet. As the head of the Tax Ministry, the Danish Tax Minister is responsible for areas concerning taxes and tariffs, as well as labour marked funds. The current Tax Minister is Jeppe Bruus Christensen.

See also
List of Minister for Taxation (Denmark)

References

External links
The Tax Ministry of Denmark

 
Government ministerial offices of Denmark